Pavel Vaqif oglu Pashayev (born 4 January 1988) is a professional Azerbaijani football who plays as a right-back. He was raised in Ukraine to parents of Azerbaijani descent, and originally represented various Ukrainian youth teams and the national team on 2 occasions, before switching to the Azerbaijan national football team.

Career
Pashayev was the product of the Dnipro Dnipropetrovsk Youth school system. He was loaned from Dnipro Dnipropetrovsk to Kryvbas at the end of the 2008–09 summer transfer window until the end of 2008. He was recalled back to Dnipro in January 2009. On 25 July 2014 Pashayev signed with Metalurh Zaporizhya. On 18 February 2016 Pashayev signed with Gabala FK.
On 17 July 2017 Pashayev signed with FC Oleksandriya.

International career
On 2 February 2009, Pavel Pashayev was called up to the Ukraine team for the first time in his career, for friendlies against Slovakia and Serbia. He debuted on 10 February against Slovakia.

Since he only played for Ukraine in friendlies, he was still eligible to join the Azerbaijan national football team. He made his first appearance for Azerbaijan in a 2–1 friendly win over Moldova on 17 November 2015.

Personal life
His twin brother, Maksym Pashayev played as a defender for Dnipro Dnipropetrovsk, but died after a car accident in December 2008.

Club statistics

International

Statistics accurate as of match played 16 November 2019

References

External links
 
 
 

1988 births
Living people
People from Krasnyi Luch
Citizens of Azerbaijan through descent
Azerbaijani footballers
Azerbaijan international footballers
Azerbaijani expatriate footballers
Ukrainian footballers
Ukraine international footballers
Ukraine under-21 international footballers
Ukrainian people of Azerbaijani descent
Ukrainian Premier League players
Ukrainian First League players
Expatriate footballers in Ukraine
Azerbaijani expatriate sportspeople in Ukraine
Azerbaijan Premier League players
FC Dnipro players
FC Kryvbas Kryvyi Rih players
FC Karpaty Lviv players
FC Metalurh Zaporizhzhia players
Gabala FC players
FC Stal Kamianske players
FC Oleksandriya players
FC VPK-Ahro Shevchenkivka players
Ukrainian twins
Twin sportspeople
Dual internationalists (football)
Association football defenders
Ukraine youth international footballers
Sportspeople from Luhansk Oblast